Severe Tropical Cyclone Ului was one of the fastest intensifying tropical cyclones on record, strengthening from a tropical storm to a Category 5 equivalent cyclone within a 30-hour span in March 2010. Throughout Queensland, Australia, infrastructural damage from the storm amounted to A$20 million (US$18 million) and agricultural losses reached A$60 million (US$54 million).

Meteorological history

At that time, the system was classified as Tropical Disturbance 13F. Early the following day, the system became sufficiently organised for the FMS to upgrade the disturbance to a tropical depression. Several hours later, the Joint Typhoon Warning Center (JTWC) also began monitoring the system. By this time, deep convection had developed around a low-level circulation and banding features had formed. A slow westward movement was expected as the depression was situated north of a subtropical ridge.

On 12 March, 13F was upgraded to Tropical Cyclone Ului. By early on 13 March, it was a category 2 cyclone. Later that day, Ului strengthened into a category 3, making it a severe tropical cyclone. The storm continued to strengthen throughout the day and that night it became a category 5. Ului became the first category 5 South Pacific cyclone since Severe Tropical Cyclone Percy in February 2005 but weakened to category 4 about the time it crossed the 160°E meridian. Ului was predicted to restrengthen back into a category 5 as it moved away from an upper-level low and Severe Tropical Cyclone Tomas; however Ului remained as a category 4 and had weakened to a category 3 system in the early hours of 18 March. It weakened further to category 2 for a while before regaining category 3 strength.

Preparations

Solomon Islands
As the storm approached the Solomon Islands, officials advised that most vessels remain at port due to rough seas produced by Ului. Search and rescue personnel were also placed on standby. On 16 March, UNICEF announced that they would supply the Solomon Islands with relief funds following the passage of the cyclone. During the passage of the storm, airport officials cancelled many flights due to dangerous weather conditions. These cancellations took place over a two-day span, leaving many passengers stranded during the storm.

Australia

After Cyclone Ului passed through the Solomon Islands, officials in Queensland, Australia began warning residents about the possibility of the storm making landfall in the region. Large swells produced by the system prompted lifeguards to close large areas of public beaches. People who wanted to go into the ocean were strongly urged to only do so in patrolled areas. Additionally, fishermen removed their shark nets from the region in anticipation of winds exceeding . The removal of shark nets was a first in preparation for cyclones. Although the removal of the nets would prevent damage to them from the storm, it left swimmers at risk for shark attacks. Roughly 8,100 people signed up for the competition; however, managers stated that if the swells continued to increase, they may have to relocate the event elsewhere. These swells were anticipated to be the largest experienced along the Queensland coastline in the past decade and emergency management officials warned residents living along coastal areas that the waves would likely inundate low-lying regions.

On 18 March, new forecasts of the future track of Ului indicated that it would make landfall in Queensland. Residents along the Sunshine Coast were advised to prepare their homes for a possible Category 4 cyclone and stock up on non-perishable foods. Later on 18 March, the Bureau of Meteorology expected that the cyclone would cross or near the Queensland coast, between Cardwell and Mackay, on 21 March as a category 3 cyclone. on 19 March, Ului was downgraded to a category 2 cyclone. Several ports along the Queensland coastline were shut down for several days as large waves impacted the region. Transportation of coal and other raw materials was halted in these areas as well. On 21 March, the cyclone weakened as it moved inland and was downgraded below cyclone strength. 60,000 homes were without power in Cannonvale, Mackay, Proserpine, Sarina and surrounding areas. Most of the major damage occurred at Proserpine and the areas to the south and west such as Crystalbrook, Kelsey Creek, Silver Creek, Dittmer, Gunyarra, Andromache, Bloomsbury, Thoopara etc. Airlie Beach/Cannonvale/Cannonvalley sustained relatively minor damage due to them being sheltered from most of the damaging winds by the conway ranges which the Conway National Park is part of. A National Rugby League match in the region threatened by Ului was started roughly two hours early to avoid playing during the storm.

Impact

Solomon Islands

As a Category 5 cyclone, Ului passed through the southern Solomon Islands, causing severe damage on the islands of Rennell and Guadalcanal as well as Bellona province. Large swells produced by the storm washed away several homes along coastal areas. Flooding was also reported on several islands; however, officials confirmed that no fatalities resulted from the storm. Maximum winds on the affected islands reached . On Rennell Island, initial reports stated that at least ten homes had been severely damaged or destroyed in several villages. Light to moderate damage was sustained on Makira and Guadalcanal, with at least two homes sustaining damage. Unconfirmed reports of a large wave inundating several villages, washing away homes and overturning large boulders came from east Makira around 4:00 pm local time. Another village on the western side of Makira was reportedly inundated roughly five hours later. Later damage assessments made on Makira Island confirmed at least 13 homes were destroyed and several more were damaged. The most severe damage took place in Woau village where ten homes were destroyed.

Australia

On 19 March, a teenage surf lifesaver, Saxon Bird, was knocked off his surf ski amidst  waves produced by Ului. After being struck by his ski, he was transported to a local hospital before dying from his injuries hours later. As a result of his death, the water events of the Australian Surf Life Saving championships at Kurrawa Beach on the Gold Coast were cancelled. The system made landfall near Airlie Beach, north of Mackay, at about 1:30 am AEST on Sunday morning, 21 March and headed in a SSW direction maintaining category 3 status until it reached roughly halfway between Proserpine, Queensland and Collinsville, Queensland.

Authorities said there were reports of roof damage and powerlines down communities throughout the region. 60,000 homes were reported to be without power between Mackay, Proserpine and Collinsville. Some sites reported over 400 mm of rain in 24 hours.

Aftermath and records
Between 13 and 14 March, Cyclone Ului underwent an unusually explosive phase of rapid intensification. During a 24-hour span, the system intensified from a tropical storm to a Category 5 equivalent cyclone, tying Hurricane Wilma in 2005 for the fastest intensification of a system from tropical storm to Category 5. They also estimated that the storm's minimal central pressure had decreased from 982 mbar (hPa) to 918 mbar (hPa), a drop of 64 mbar (hPa), during this span.

See also

 List of the most intense tropical cyclones
 List of tropical cyclones
 2009–10 South Pacific cyclone season
Cyclone Pat
 2009–10 Australian region cyclone season
 Cyclone Yasi
 Cyclone Ita

References

External links

Australian Bureau of Meteorology (TCWC Brisbane) .
Queensland cyclone photographs, State Library of Queensland. Includes photographs of the aftermath of Cyclone Ului.

2009–10 South Pacific cyclone season
Tropical cyclones in the Solomon Islands
Tropical cyclones in Vanuatu
Tropical cyclones in Queensland
Category 5 South Pacific cyclones
Category 4 Australian region cyclones
2009–10 Australian region cyclone season
Retired South Pacific cyclones
Tropical cyclones in 2010